A bean bag (also beanbag) is a sealed bag containing dried beans, PVC pellets, expanded polystyrene, or expanded polypropylene. The bags are commonly used for throwing games, but they have various other applications.

Furniture

Designed by Piero Gatti, Cesare Paolini and Franco Teodoro and produced by the Italian company Zanotta in 1969, beanbags have become a globally recognised piece of furniture. It is said that they noticed the staff would sit on bags filled with styrofoam during their coffee and cigarette breaks. The original beanbag chair is called "Sacco", which is a pear-shaped leather bag filled with styrofoam beans and is still in production today.

Bean bags can be made from materials including leather, suede, corduroy and fake fur. Polyester bean bags are waterproof and can be used outdoors. Giant bean bags can also be used as a cheap alternative to buying a sofa or couch.

Quite a variety of bean bags are sold, including baby bean bags that are known for helping babies that suffer from colic. They are also known for helping with plagiocephaly or more commonly referred to as flat head syndrome in babies.

In August 2014, Ace Bayou Corp recalled 2.2 million bean bag chairs in the United States due to a design fault which allowed the chairs to be unzipped by children. Two children died from suffocation after climbing inside the chairs and inhaling the foam beads.

Games

 Beanbag was a game referred to at the turn of the twentieth century by Finley Peter Dunne as the antithesis of roughness of politics, Politics ain't beanbag!.
 Cornhole is a bean bag tossing game similar to horseshoes and quoits, played with bean bags and two goals.
 Footbag (also known as Hacky Sack, a trademark) is a type of ball-shaped bean bag that is used to play various games.
 Bean bags are also commonly used for juggling.
 In gridiron football beanbags are used to mark the point of a change of possession (where a punt or kickoff is caught, an interception is made, or a fumble occurs)
 Bean bags are often used for a game similar to dodgeball where small square bean bags are slid across the floor with the object to hit the opposing team's players in the foot. The game is particularly popular in American elementary schools as a safer alternative to dodgeball.

Other uses
 Bean bags are used as bean bag round ammunition for non lethal impact weapons.
 In benchrest and long-range shooting, bean bags or "shooting bags" are often used to support the gun's fore-end and buttstock, and allows the shooter to fine-adjust the aim by gently squeezing the rear bag.
 Clutching technology for robots makes use of bean bags.
 Smaller bean bags can be used to stabilize a camera when a tripod is not available.

References

External links
 
 wikiHow To Make a Bean Bag

Bags
Physical activity and dexterity toys
Articles containing video clips